Jumbo Lake is a lake in the Canadian province of Saskatchewan in the transition zone between parkland and boreal forest. It is also known as Big Jumbo Lake to differentiate it from adjoining Little Jumbo Lake. Big and Little Jumbo Lakes make up the heart of Makwa Lake Provincial Park and are part of several inter-connected lakes that include Makwa Lake and Upper Makwa Lake. The southern half of the lake is within Makwa Lake Provincial Park and the northern half is within Makwa Lake 129B Indian reserve. Access to both lakes is from Highway 699.

Jumbo, Little Jumbo, and Makwa Lakes are all connected and the water levels are controlled by the Makwa Lake Control dam, which is located at the source of the Makwa River at the north-east corner of Makwa Lake.

Parks and recreation 
Most of the southern half of Big and Little Jumbo Lakes are within Makwa Lake Provincial Park. There are three campgrounds with about 260 campsites and several beaches around the lakes. Jumbo Beach Campground, Stabler Point Campground, Makwa Lake Beach, and Loon Lake Golf Course are located on Little Jumbo while Mewasin Beach Campground and Silver Birch Bible Camp are on Big Jumbo.

Fish species 
Fish species commonly found in the lake include northern pike, walleye, and yellow perch.

See also 
List of lakes of Saskatchewan
Tourism in Saskatchewan
List of protected areas of Saskatchewan

References

External links 
Makwa Lake Park

Lakes of Saskatchewan
Loon Lake No. 561, Saskatchewan
Division No. 17, Saskatchewan